David Watt (24 November 1916 – 25 September 2015) was an Australian cricketer. He played seventeen first-class matches for Western Australia between 1938 and 1949. His son Keith was an Australian rules footballer who played in Subiaco's 1973 WANFL premiership winning side.

See also
 List of Western Australia first-class cricketers

References

External links

 

1916 births
2015 deaths
Australian cricketers
Western Australia cricketers
Cricketers from Edinburgh
Scottish emigrants to Australia